is a Japanese politician from Takasaki, Gunma, who served as Minister for Foreign Affairs from September 2008 to September 2009. He was Minister of Education under Prime Minister Yoshirō Mori. He is former Prime Minister Yasuhiro Nakasone's son.

Nakasone was appointed as head of the Science and Technology Agency by Prime Minister Keizō Obuchi in early October 1999. In the Cabinet of Prime Minister Tarō Asō, appointed on 24 September 2008, Nakasone was appointed as Minister of Foreign Affairs.

Early years

Nakasone was born in Gunma Prefecture in 1945 and graduated from Keio University with a degree in Business and Commerce.

After graduation, he worked briefly at Asahi Kasei and then became Special Assistant to his father, Prime Minister Yasuhiro Nakasone and Secretary to the President of the Liberal Democratic Party.

Nakasone has been a member of the House of Councillors since being elected in 1986.

Revisionism regarding 'Comfort women'

Nakasone is affiliated to the openly revisionist organization Nippon Kaigi. His own father Yasuhiro Nakasone is claimed to have organized a 'comfort station' in 1942 when he was a lieutenant paymaster in Japan's Imperial Navy. Hirofumi Nakasone chairs a commission established to consider "concrete measures to restore Japan's honor with regard to the comfort women issue."

Honors 
 - Bands of the Order of the Aztec Eagle

References 

1945 births
Living people
People from Takasaki, Gunma
Keio University alumni
Children of prime ministers of Japan
Members of the House of Councillors (Japan)
Education ministers of Japan
Members of Nippon Kaigi
Foreign ministers of Japan